The Christmas Battles were offensive operations of the Russian army  and Latvian units during World War I in the area of Jelgava, Latvia, by the Russian 12th Army of the Northern Front. They took place from December 23 until December 29, 1916 according to the calendar used in Russia at the time (or January 5 to January 11, 1917 according to the Gregorian Calendar then in use in the West and now in use almost everywhere), The Army was commanded by Gen. Radko Dimitriev; it was opposed by the 8th German Army.

The battles took place in a swampy region, Tīreļpurvs (Tīrelis Swamp), between Lake Babīte and Jelgava. The main assault force was the VI Siberian Rifle Corps which included two Latvian Riflemen brigades ("strēlnieki" who became a part of Latvian folklore and an important factor in the Latvian national awakening movement).

Background
The German 8th army's advance was stopped near Riga in October 1915. Almost immediately German forces started to fortify their positions. A huge, 30 km. long wall (the so-called:German Wall) built out of sand and wood was constructed across Tīreļpurvs, separating both armies for more than a year.

Also a railway line was constructed for the delivery of ammunition.
The Russian 12th Army was divided into three groups before it attacked. The main task force was Babīte group which consisted of 48 battalions and 208 cannon. On the opposite side were 19 German battalions from the 6th Landwehr-Brigade. The core of the Babīte group was the VI Siberian corps. which included both Latvian Rifleman brigades.

The battle
After the failure of the 1916 campaigns in Romania the Commander of the Russian Empire's 12th Army received an order to attack on the Riga front. Its objective was to attract the German reserve forces, thus helping their allies to resist on the Verdun battlefield. In mid-December 1916 there was a deep fall in temperature with a heavy frost, making it possible to move through the now frozen bog and gain access to the German fortifications. It was quickly decided to launch an attack at Christmas. The main objective being to the capture of Jelgava (Mitau).

The attack began early in the morning of the 23 December (5 January) and surprised the Germans, who thought that the Russian troops would be celebrating Christmas.
Latvian Riflemen were the advance guard in the attack, their main task being to capture the first German lines and clear the way for the main force following behind them. Wearing white winter camouflage uniforms and using the cover of a heavy snowstorm the Latvians cut passages through the German barbed wire barriers. After this was done, the main forces of the two Latvian Riflemen brigades advanced through the breached wire using the element of surprise without any artillery support to prevent giving the German garrison forces an advanced warning of the ongoing operation. After successfully crossing the German Wall they captured the first German battle line after a brief skirmish. Many of the soldiers could not make it to the wall and did not have a way to retreat without the Germans spotting them, thus these units chose to die from frostbite (whilst not moving) over betraying their fellow Latvian brothers.

The battle continued over the next two days with varying success, as all the Latvian units became involved in heavy fighting within the breached position and the German defence stiffened as it received reinforcements from Jelgava. In further fighting the German second defensive line at Mangaļi homestead fell to the assaulting forces. At this point the attack was stopped as the Russian Commander-in-Chief had no reinforcements on hand to put into the action apart from 17th Siberian Regiment, which refused to go to battle, this mutiny was supported by several other units from the II and VI Siberian Army Corps, and an augury of things to come in the Russian Revolution. Whilst the mutiny by the Siberian units on the field caused a halt in the Russian battle-plan, the Germans were receiving substantial troop reinforcement from Jelgava, and quickly launched a counter-attack upon the Russian and Latvian positions in their breached defences. Fighting in a mid-winter temperature of -35 °C, the Latvian Riflemen units held back the German attacks for 48 hours.

On 25 December (7 January) Russian troops launched an attack on heavily fortified sand dunes on the northern side of Tīreļpurvs.  A central part of those fortifications was a fortified hill, which later was named  Ložmetējkalns ("Machine-gun Hill").
On Christmas morning the 3rd and 7th the Latvian Rifleman Regiments, together with the 53rd Siberian Regiment, after suffering heavy losses, partially surrounded the German forces. 
The 2nd Latvian Rifleman Brigade attacked the position from the rear and thus finally broke the German resistance on Machine-gun Hill. Many German soldiers managed to retreat, around 1000 being taken prisoners. It was the biggest victory by the Russian forces on the Riga Front and the German Army lost one of its strongest fortifications. Overall, a more than 7 km. wide gap was made in the German lines. However, the Commander of the 12th Russian Army was not in a position to exploit the opportunity and organize a pursuit because he had not anticipated the Latvian Rifle Brigade's victory.

January battles-German counterattack
After their partial defeat in the Christmas battles, the German 8th Army organized a counterattack to regain their lost positions. The Germans received strong reinforcements and many fresh divisions were stationed in Jelgava.
In the early morning of 23 January a massive artillery barrage started, which was soon followed by an infantry attack along the whole battle line.  The main German forces consisted of the 1st. Reserve division (1. Reserve-Division) and 2nd Infantry Division (2. Infanterie-Division). They attacked across Tīrelis Swamp against the Latvian and Russian positions. Latvian riflemen and the Siberians desperately defended their positions for three days. The Russians tried to launch three counterattacks, but all of them failed. In one of those counterattacks Latvian riflemen were forced to attack across an open field against German machine guns and thus suffered heavy losses (especially the 3rd Kurzeme Regiment). 
The temperature dropped to -38 °C making it impossible for either side to continue active warfare.
The Germans managed to regain 80% of their lost positions, although 'Machine-gun Hill' stayed in Russian hands.

Aftermath
The Christmas Battles gave the Latvian Riflemen a reputation as capable warriors, but they also suffered huge losses as the Latvian Riflemen lost more than a third of their original fighting force (the Latvians lost about 9000 soldiers). Christmas Eve's battle slogan of liberation of Jelgava and all of Courland was proved to be just a slogan without serious coverage. The heavy casualties resulted in strong resentment against the Russian generals and the Tsar among the riflemen. This resentment later proved to be a decisive factor for the increased support among the Latvian troops for the Bolsheviks, who were advocating a cease-fire and an end to the war.
However the 12th Army Command severely punished Siberian Riflemen, some of whom refused to go into battle - 92 of them were brought before the war tribunal and condemned to death, and several hundred were sent back to Siberia.

Today Tīrelis Swamp and the nearby forests are part of the Museum of the Christmas Battles which in its turn is a branch of Latvian War Museum.  The museum was created to honour Latvian riflemen and other soldiers who fought on the Riga Front during the First World War. Many of the old trenches are still  visible in this area today, complemented by reconstructed fortifications and bunkers.

Bibliography
Information of the Christmas Battles (in German).
Илья Максимов. Военно-исторический атлас России. IX - XX века. ДРОФА, Дом интеллектуальной книги, 2006 г. (in Russian)
History of Latvian Rifleman's
 Chronology of the Christmas Battles (In English)

References

Battles of World War I
Battles of the Eastern Front (World War I)
Battles involving Latvia
January 1917 events